The 1972 United States Senate election in Alaska was held on November 7, 1972. Republican U.S. Senator Ted Stevens, who was first appointed & elected to complete the unexpired term of Bob Bartlett was re-elected to his second term; a full term in office, over Democrat Gene Guess.

General election

Results

See also 
 1972 United States Senate elections

References 

Alaska
1972
1972 Alaska elections